Pohatu Marine Reserve is a  marine reserve centered on Flea Bay and lies between Ounu-hau Point and Redcliffe Point on Banks Peninsula in the Canterbury region of New Zealand. It was formally notified in 1999.

See also
Marine reserves of New Zealand

References

External links
Pohatu Marine Reserve at the Department of Conservation
Map of the reserve Department of Conservation

Marine reserves of New Zealand
Protected areas of Canterbury, New Zealand
1999 establishments in New Zealand
Protected areas established in 1999